The  is a dam on the Niida River, located in the city of Hachinohe,  Aomori Prefecture in the Tōhoku region of northern Honshū, Japan.

History
Yomasari Dam was designed as a multi-purpose dam, to provide for flood control in the event of heavy rains or typhoons, which had potential to flood downtown Hachinohe. The reservoir created was intended to provide water for tap water, as well as agricultural and industrial purposes, and to create a new recreational area for fishing and boating for the residents of Hachinohe. However, there is no hydroelectric power station associated with the dam.

Preliminary design work began on the Yomasari Dam in 1976, with main construction beginning in 1989, and was completed by 2003 by a consortium of the Obayashi Corporation, Sumitomo Mitsui Construction, and Tekken Corporation.

Design
The Yomasari Dam is a hollow-core concrete gravity dam with several central spillways.

References
Japan Commission on Large Dams. Dams in Japan:Past, Present and Future. CRC Press (2009). 
photo page with data

Gravity dams
Dams in Aomori Prefecture
Dams completed in 2003
Hachinohe